The 1990 South Carolina State Bulldogs football team represented South Carolina State University as a member of the Mid-Eastern Athletic Conference (MEAC) during the 1990 NCAA Division I-AA football season. Led by second-year head coach Willie Jeffries, the Bulldogs compiled an overall record of 4–6 with a mark of 2–4 in conference play, placing fifth in the MEAC. South Carolina State played home games at Bulldog Stadium in Orangeburg, South Carolina.

Schedule

Roster

References 

South Carolina State
South Carolina State Bulldogs football seasons
South Carolina State Bulldogs football